Nikos Temponeras (1954 – January 8, 1991) was a high school mathematics teacher, and a member of the left-wing Labour Antimilitaristic Front (EAM). Temponeras was murdered in Patras during the student protests of 1990–1991 by Giannis Kalampokas, a municipal councillor and president of the local New Democracy branch. Temponeras was the first of five fatalities caused by attacks against the protesters.

Assassination 
Nikos Temponeras was the first casualty during the students' demonstrations against the bill of Minister of Education Vassilis Kontogiannopoulos. Four more people died during these protests due to a fire in a shop during a demonstration in Athens.

The murderer was municipal councilor and president of the local branch of Youth Organization of New Democracy (ONNED), Giannis Kalampokas. The murder occurred on January 8, 1991, when Kalampokas hit Temponeras in the head with an iron bar while ONNED was trying to recapture the school complex of 3rd and 7th Patras high schools (where Temponeras was a teacher) that was occupied by the students. In order to take control of the school, the members of ONNED, led by Kalampokas, made an attack with bats, iron bars and cement tiles against the occupiers of the school that were supported by many parents and teachers, including Temponeras.

Aftermath 
The assassination, occurring in a period of fierce political confrontation, sparkled a wave of protests throughout Greece. The day after the murder, the Minister of Education Kontogiannopoulos resigned and the most controversial articles of the bill were removed.

Kalampokas was tried and sentenced to life in prison for murder but later his sentence was reduced to 17 years and 3 months in prison and finally to 16 years and 9 months. He was released on February 2, 1998.

The school complex where the murder occurred was named after Nikos Temponeras.

References 

1991 in Greece
1991 murders in Europe
January 1991 events in Europe
January 1991 crimes
Greek educators
Assassinations in Greece
History of Patras
Deaths from head injury
Protest-related deaths